Pat Newman (died 2022) was a tennis coach.

Pat Newman may also refer to:

Pat Newman (rower) (born 1963)
Pat Newman (American football) (born 1968)